Del Harris (born 13 July 1969) is a former professional squash player from England.

Harris won the World Junior Squash Championships title in 1988, and went on to become one of the leading players in the men's professional game in the 1990s. He represented England in the 1989 Men's World Team Squash Championships and 1991 Men's World Team Squash Championships.

In 1995, Harris reached the final of the 1995 Men's World Open Squash Championship, where he lost to the legendary Pakistani player Jansher Khan 15–10, 17–14, 16–17, 15–8. That year Harris was also part of the winning England team in the 1995 Men's World Team Squash Championships and in addition he won the Super Series Finals event, beating Brett Martin of Australia in the final 10–8, 7–9, 9–4, 6–9, 9–2. Further success came in 1997 when he was once again part of the winning England team in the 1997 Men's World Team Squash Championships.

Harris won the British National Squash Championships twice, in 1987 and 1989 and reached his career-high world ranking of World No. 5 in March 1996.

References

External links 
 
 

English male squash players
1969 births
Living people